A robotic lawn mower is an autonomous robot used to cut lawn grass. A typical robotic lawn mower (in particular earlier generation models) requires the user to set up a border wire around the lawn that defines the area to be mowed. The robot uses this wire to locate the boundary of the area to be trimmed and in some cases to locate a recharging dock.

Robotic lawn mowers are increasingly sophisticated, are self-docking and some contain rain sensors if necessary, nearly eliminating human interaction. Robotic lawn mowers represented the second largest category of domestic robots used by the end of 2005.

In 2012, the growth of robotic lawn mower sales was 15 times that of the traditional styles. 
With the emergence of smart phones some robotic mowers have integrated features within custom apps to adjust settings or scheduled mowing times and frequency, as well as manually control the mower with a digital joystick.

Modern robotic lawn mowers can contain specialized sensors, allowing them to automatically mow around obstacles or even go to sleep when it starts to rain.

The vast majority of robotic lawn mowers tackle the task utilizing a "random" mowing system. Basically the machine bounces around on the lawn until it hits the boundary wire limiting the working area, then changes heading until it hits the wire again. Depending on the lawn size, this might take a very long time, so the machine must more or less be in continuous operations. One exception is the Bosch robotic lawn mower "Indego" which creates a map of the users garden and then tackles the task in a systematic manner, similar to the more modern robotic vacuum cleaners.

History 
In 1969, the MowBot is introduced and patented by S Lawrence Bellinger and already showing many features of today's most popular products.

In 1992, the first fully solar powered robotic mower is patented by André Collens and sold to Husqvarna which markets it in 1995.

In 2012, the Bosch Indego introduced lawn mapping, to mow in a systematic manner instead of a random pattern.

As of 2019, vision-based robotic mowers, without perimeter wire, were announced.

In 2020, Husqvarna announced a new robotic mower (EPOS) that can navigate completely without boundary wire, allowing location accuracy of 2-3 centimeters by using satellite navigation on a reference station.

Technology 
The mower can find its charging station via radio frequency emissions, by following a boundary wire, or by following an optional guide wire. This can eliminate wear patterns in the lawn caused by the mower only being able to follow one wire back to the station.

To get to remote areas or areas only accessible through narrow passages the mower can follow a guide wire or a boundary wire out of the station.

Batteries used include nickel–metal hydride (NiMH), lithium-ion and lead-acid.

In 2019 an all-wheel-drive (AWD) drive robotic mower was released by Husqvarna.

Examples

See also 
 Domestic robots
 Lawn mower
 List of home automation topics
 Robotics
 Modern conveniences

References

External links 
 

Lawn mowers
Lawn mover
Technology in society
20th-century inventions